The 1992 season in the Latvian Higher League, named Virslīga, was the second football (soccer) domestic competition since the Baltic nation gained independence from the Soviet Union on 6 September 1991. Twelve teams competed in this edition, with Skonto FC claiming the title.

Final table

Match table

Play-Off

Top scorers

Awards

Skonto FC 1992

Notes

References
RSSSF
Skonto FC

Latvian Higher League seasons
1
Latvia
Latvia